Alexander Edward Singbush (January 31, 1914 – March 8, 1969) was a Canadian professional ice hockey defenceman who played 32 games in the National Hockey League for the Montreal Canadiens. He was born in Winnipeg, Manitoba, but moved to Sudbury, Ontario in the mid 1930s to find work. He played in both the NHL and AHL and returned to Sudbury in the early 1940s to work at INCO (International Nickel Corporation). He played many sports in the local leagues which were quite active here in Sudbury and Northern Ontario at that time. At the end of the war he began to work for the Canadian Pacific Railway as a fireman and then an engineer.  He was married to Elizabeth Francis Mulligan and they had four children. 'Sing' died in 1969 in Sudbury.

References

External links

1914 births
1969 deaths
Canadian ice hockey defencemen
Ice hockey people from Ontario
Sportspeople from Greater Sudbury
Montreal Canadiens players
New Haven Eagles players
Providence Reds players
Ice hockey people from Winnipeg
Washington Lions players